Kari Arvo Ilari "Kärtsy" Hatakka (born December 17, 1967 in Helsinki, Finland) is the vocalist and bassist for the Finnish music group Waltari, which he founded in 1986.

He has been a full-time musician since 1991, and worked on the soundtrack for the Finnish computer game Max Payne (parts 1 and 2) with Kimmo Kajasto.

Discography
 Lights Go Wild (Single) – 2000
 Get On Top (Single) – 2001
 Akseli Ja Eelo – 2004
 WAX Real Time Orchestra: Smalltown Boy (Single) – 2006
 Duty Freedom – 2010
 aWay – 2014
 Maunula - Kärtsy plays Flatus – 2016

External links
https://kartsy.net/
http://www.kartsy.com
Artist profile at OverClocked ReMix
 

1967 births
Living people
English-language singers from Finland
Finnish male musicians
Video game composers
Progressive metal bass guitarists